The Eastern Zone was one of the three regional zones of the 1984 Davis Cup.

12 teams entered the Eastern Zone in total, with the winner promoted to the following year's World Group. Japan defeated Pakistan in the final and qualified for the 1985 World Group.

Participating nations

Draw

First round

Pakistan vs. Malaysia

Chinese Taipei vs. Hong Kong

China vs. Sri Lanka

Singapore vs. Philippines

Quarterfinals

Pakistan vs. Indonesia

Hong Kong vs. Thailand

China vs. South Korea

Japan vs. Philippines

Semifinals

Pakistan vs. Thailand

China vs. Japan

Final

Pakistan vs. Japan

References

External links
Davis Cup official website

Davis Cup Asia/Oceania Zone
Eastern Zone